Cătălina Gheorghiu (born 21 June 1969) is a Romanian middle-distance runner. She competed in the women's 1500 metres at the 1996 Summer Olympics.

References

1969 births
Living people
Athletes (track and field) at the 1996 Summer Olympics
Romanian female middle-distance runners
Olympic athletes of Romania
Place of birth missing (living people)